Ireland participated in the Eurovision Song Contest 2018 with the song "Together", performed by Ryan O'Shaughnessy and written by himself, Mark Caplice and Laura Elizabeth Hughes. The song and the singer were internally selected in January 2018 by the Irish broadcaster Raidió Teilifís Éireann (RTÉ) to represent the nation at the 2018 contest in Lisbon, Portugal.

Ireland was drawn to compete in the first semi-final of the Eurovision Song Contest which took place on 8 May 2018. He sang in 18th position and qualified for the final, marking the country's first qualification since the 2013 Contest.

Background

Ireland has won the contest a record seven times in total. The country's first win came in 1970, with then-18-year-old Dana winning with "All Kinds of Everything". Ireland holds the record for being the only country to win the contest three times in a row (in 1992, 1993 and 1994), as well as having the only three-time winner (Johnny Logan, who won in 1980 as a singer, 1987 as a singer-songwriter, and again in 1992 as a songwriter). In 2011 and 2012, Jedward represented the nation for two consecutive years, managing to qualify to the final both times and achieve Ireland's highest position in the contest since 2000, placing eighth in 2011 with the song "Lipstick". However, in 2013, despite managing to qualify to the final, Ryan Dolan and his song "Only Love Survives" placed last in the final. The Irish entries in 2014, "Heartbeat" performed by Can-linn featuring Kasey Smith, in 2015, "Playing with Numbers" performed by Molly Sterling, in 2016 "Sunlight" performed by Nicky Byrne, and in 2017 "Dying to Try" performed by Brendan Murray all failed to qualify to the final.

Before Eurovision

Internal selection
RTÉ confirmed their intentions to participate at the 2018 Eurovision Song Contest on 4 August 2017. On 14 September 2017, the broadcaster opened a submission period where artists and composers "with a proven track record of success in the music industry" were able to submit their entries until 6 November 2017. In addition to the public submissions, RTÉ reserved the right to approach established artists and composers to submit entries and to match songs with different artists to the ones who submitted an entry. At the closing of the deadline, over 300 entries were received.

On 31 January 2018, RTÉ announced that they had internally selected Ryan O'Shaughnessy to represent Ireland in Lisbon. The song to be performed by O'Shaughnessy, "Together", shortlisted and selected by a jury panel with members appointed by RTÉ, was released and uploaded on YouTube on 9 March 2018. The song was written by O'Shaughnessy, Mark Caplice and Laura Elizabeth Hughes. O'Shaughnessy's first live performance of the song took place on 9 April, during The Late Late Show.

At Eurovision 
According to Eurovision rules, all nations with the exceptions of the host country and the "Big Five" (France, Germany, Italy, Spain and the United Kingdom) are required to qualify from one of two semi-finals in order to compete for the final; the top ten countries from each semi-final progress to the final. The European Broadcasting Union (EBU) split up the competing countries into six different pots based on voting patterns from previous contests, with countries with favourable voting histories put into the same pot. On 29 January 2018, a special allocation draw was held which placed each country into one of the two semi-finals, as well as which half of the show they would perform in. Ireland was placed into the first semi-final, to be held on 8 May 2018, and was scheduled to perform in the second half of the show.

Once all the competing songs for the 2018 contest had been released, the running order for the semi-finals was decided by the shows' producers rather than through another draw, so that similar songs were not placed next to each other. Ireland was set to perform in position 18, following the entry from Switzerland and preceding the entry from Cyprus.

Semi-final
Ireland performed eighteenth in the first semi-final, following the entry from Switzerland and preceding the entry from Cyprus. At the end of the show, Ireland was announced as one of the ten countries who qualified to the grand final, making it their first qualification since 2013. Following the semi-final, Ryan O'Shaughnessy participated in a press conference with the other winners in which they drew which half of the final they'd perform in. Ireland was drawn to perform in the second half of the grand final. It was later revealed that Ireland placed sixth in the semi-final, receiving a total of 179 points: 108 points from the televoting and 71 points from the juries.

Voting
Voting during the three shows involved each country awarding two sets of points from 1-8, 10 and 12: one from their professional jury and the other from televoting. Each nation's jury consisted of five music industry professionals who are citizens of the country they represent, with their names published before the contest to ensure transparency. This jury judged each entry based on: vocal capacity; the stage performance; the song's composition and originality; and the overall impression by the act. In addition, no member of a national jury was permitted to be related in any way to any of the competing acts in such a way that they cannot vote impartially and independently. The individual rankings of each jury member as well as the nation's televoting results were released shortly after the grand final.

Points awarded to Ireland

Points awarded by Ireland

Detailed voting results
The following five members formed the Irish jury:
 Tom Dunne (jury chairperson)musician, singer, songwriter, radio presenter
 Niamh Kavanaghsinger, winner of the 1993 contest, represented Ireland in the 2010 contest
 Thomas Crosse (Crossy)radio presenter, producer
 Aoife Barrymusic and culture assistant editor at TheJournal.ie
 Kenneth Gilescreative director, choreographer, performer

Chinese broadcaster censorship
During the Chinese broadcast of the first semi-final on Mango TV, both Albania and Ireland were edited out of the show, along with their snippets in the recap of all 19 entries. Ireland was censored due to its representation of a homosexual couple on-stage. In addition, the LGBT flag was also blurred out from the broadcast. As a result, the EBU terminated its partnership with the Chinese broadcaster, explaining that censorship "is not in line with the EBU's values of universality and inclusivity and its proud tradition of celebrating diversity through music." The termination led to a ban on televising the second semi-final and the grand final in the country. A spokesperson for the broadcaster's parent company Hunan TV said they "weren't aware" of the edits made to the programme. Ireland's representative O'Shaughnessy told the BBC in an interview, "they haven't taken this lightly and I think it's a move in the right direction, so I'm happy about it."

References 

2018
Countries in the Eurovision Song Contest 2018
Eurovision
Eurovision